Menno Westendorp (born October 5, 1969) is a Dutch cinematographer.

Filmography
The Seven of Daran: Battle of Pareo Rock (2008)
Offers (2005)
Jesus is a Palestinian (1999)

Awards
2008 Won Golden Calf Award for  Best Photography (Het echte leven)

References

External links

Profile at Internet Encyclopedia of Cinematographers

1969 births
Living people
Dutch cinematographers
People from Geldrop
21st-century Dutch people